The 2016 Wichita Force season is the franchise's 2nd season as a professional indoor football franchise and second as a member of Champions Indoor Football (CIF). One of nine teams in the CIF for the inaugural 2016 season, the Wichita Force is owned by Wichita Indoor Football LLC, led by managing partner Marv Fisher. The Force clinched their first division title with a 44–30 victory over the Sioux City Bandits.

Schedule

Regular season

Post-season

CIF Standings

Roster

References

Wichita Force
Wichita Force
Wichita Force